San Stefano is a neighborhood in Alexandria, Egypt. The area was known for a landmark hotel-casino that was demolished in the late 1990s.  That hotel was replaced by the San Stefano Grand Plaza, a hotel-apartment-shopping mall complex that includes a Four Seasons luxury hotel, opened in 2007 and apartments, housed in the tallest building in Alexandria.

See also 
 Neighborhoods in Alexandria

References

Populated places in Alexandria Governorate
Neighbourhoods of Alexandria